Phil Whitlock may refer to:

 Phil Whitlock (footballer) (1930–2009), Welsh footballer
 Phil Whitlock (squash player) (born 1962), English squash player

See also
Whitlock (surname)